The Oorlogskloof Nature Reserve (Afrikaans for war-gorge), covering , is located 10 km south of Nieuwoudtville in the Northern Cape, South Africa. The Oorlogskloof River runs along the eastern border of the reserve, while the western part is bordered by the Knersvlakte. Streams dissect the mountainous terrain, resulting in gorges, 36 natural pools and waterfalls found throughout the reserve. There are also examples of rock art in caves beside some of the plateaus of the reserve. There are a couple of day and overnight trails (that take 4-5 days to complete), totalling 146 km in length, with 10 log cabins.

History 
The reserve got its name from a battle that took place between indigenous Khoi people and local farmers in 1739. In 1971 it was declared a nature reserve. In 2012, the Department of Environmental Affairs funded the construction of 10 log cabins that can accommodate 15 people each, along with solar panels and septic tanks, pedestrian bridges, stream crossings and 3 boreholes. Alien invasive species like Black Wattle, Port Jackson, Eucalyptus and Prosopis were also removed at certain locations. Hiking trails and access roads were serviced.

Habitat 
Oorlogskloof Nature Reserve is found in the Karoo and Fynbos biomes. The wagon tree, Protea nitida, and a diverse range of Namaqualand flowers can be found here.

Birds 
It contains a multitude of bird species, which include Verreaux’s eagles, booted eagles, black storks and African harrier-hawk.

Fish 
The following fish species can be found on the river in the reserve: Clanwilliam yellowfish, Clanwilliam sandfish, chubbyhead barb, and sawfin. There are also the unwanted local species of banded tilapia, and alien bass and bluegill sunfish, which pose a major threat to the endemic fish found in the reserve. Freshwater mussels can also be found in pools in the reserve.

See also 

 List of protected areas of South Africa

References

Sources 
 Stuart, Chris & Mathilde (2012). National Parks and Nature Reserves. Struik Travel and Heritage. .
 Erasmus, B.P.J. (1995). Op Pad in Suid-Afrika. .

Nature reserves in South Africa